Abyssocomitas kurilokamchatica is a species of sea snail, a marine gastropod mollusk in the family Pseudomelatomidae.

Distribution
This is a deep-sea species, occurring in the Kuril–Kamchatka Trench in the northern Pacific.

References

 Kantor, Yu I., and A. V. Sysoev. "A New Genus and New Species from the Family Turridae (Gastropoda, Toxoglossa) in the Northern Part of the Pacific Ocean." Zoologichesky Zhurnal 65.4 (1986): 485–498.

External links
 

kurilokamchatica
Gastropods described in 1986